Algonquin College Kuwait is a private post-secondary institution in Kuwait specializing in information technology and business.  The college was authorized to operate in Kuwait by an Emiri Decree in October 2010. In September 2015, Algonquin College of Kuwait was established as a branch campus of Algonquin College in Ottawa, Canada.  
The Kuwaiti government allocated land to the college campus in Al-Naseem, Jahra Governarate. The Private Universities Council approved detailed construction plans in 2012. The senior management team was hired in 2014.

Campus 

The campus is located in Al-Naseem, west of Kuwait city on Ring Road 6. Campus construction began in April 2013 and Phase 1 was completed in the summer of 2015. It consists of 3 interconnected buildings for administration, services, and academic space. There are external sports facilities and covered parking spaces. In Phase 2 of construction, additional academic space and indoor sports facilities will be added. The area is mainly residential and newly developed with another community college scheduled to start construction in 2016. The new Kuwait University campus is under construction few kilometers to the east along Ring Road 6.

Programs
The college offers a 2-year diploma in business and IT programs. Various pathways to a 4-year degree are available to students who meet minimum degree requirements and wish to continue their studies.  Students graduating from the 2 year programs are issued 2 diplomas, one from the main campus in Ottawa and one from the Kuwaiti campus.
 School of English and Academic Foundations
 English and Academic Foundations
 School of Advanced Technology
 Computer Programmer
 Internet Applications and Web Development
 Interactive Media Design
 School of Business
 Business Management and Entrepreneurship
 Business Marketing
 Business Accounting
 Department of Continuing Education and Community Engagement

See also
Algonquin College

External links
Official website

Algonquin College
Universities and colleges in Kuwait
2015 establishments in Kuwait
Educational institutions established in 2015